Pommy Arrives in Australia is a 1913 Australian silent film directed by Raymond Longford. The director's first comedy, and the first purely comic feature made in Australia, it is considered a lost film.

Synopsis
An English immigrant is caught up in a series of comic incidents in Australia due to a trio of local tomboys.

Cast
Lottie Lyell
Tom Cosgrove
Tien Hogue
Helen Fergus

Production
There had been comic shorts made in Australia prior to this movie, such as Percy Gets a Job (1912) but this was the first feature-length comedy. Longford later went on to make the comedy short Ma Hogan's New Boarder.

Reception
The film only had a short run in cinemas and is among Longford's least known works.

References

External links

1913 films
Australian drama films
Australian silent films
Australian black-and-white films
Films directed by Raymond Longford
Lost Australian films
1913 drama films
1913 lost films
Lost drama films
Silent drama films